Lokmanya Nagar metro station is a metro station of Aqua Line of the Nagpur Metro, India. It is an elevated station. The metro station became operational on 28 January 2020.

Station Layout

References

Nagpur Metro stations